Geir Grung may refer to:

Geir Grung (architect) (1926–1989), Norwegian architect
Geir Grung (diplomat) (1938–2005), Norwegian diplomat